Al-Tulaysiyah al-Janubiyah is a Syrian village located in the Hirbnafsah Subdistrict in Hama District. According to the Syria Central Bureau of Statistics (CBS), al-Tulaysiyah al-Janubiyah had a population of 563 in the 2004 census.

References 

Populated places in Hama District